MobiVie is the trade name of the transit network of the agglomeration community of Vichy Val of Allier in France. This network is operated by Keolis Vichy and is composed of 8 bus regular lines (indexed A-H) and complementary services such as demand responsive transport named MobiVie sur Mesure. The bus network covers 6 of 23 municipalities in Vichy Val d'Allier.

Network
8 bus lines flowing from Monday to Saturday A B C D E F G H 
2 bus lines operating on Sundays and public holidays A B 
School lines serving major schools Scol 1 to Scol 9 and Scol 4 bis.
Demand responsive transport named MobiVie sur Mesure.

See also
Cusset
Keolis
Vichy

References

External links
Official website of MobiVie
Website of Vichy Val d'Allier

Public transport operators in France
Transport in Auvergne-Rhône-Alpes
Vichy